Pavel Uladzimiravich Kalaur, or Pavel Vladimirovich Kallaur (born 1962, Stolin District, Brest Region, Byelorussian Soviet Socialist Republic, USSR) is a Belarusian economist and banker, and the current chairman of the National Bank of the Republic of Belarus since December 2014.

Graduated from Pinsk Tekhnikum of Accounting and Credit (today  Palessie State University) and V. V. Kuybyshev Belarusian State Institute of National Economy in Minsk (today  Belarusian State Economic University). He worked in Gosbank (State Bank of the USSR) and was gradually promoted to the position of head of its branch in Valozhyn. Since 1988 headed Valozhyn branch of Agroprombank (Agricultural and Industrial Bank of the USSR), after the dissolution of the Soviet Union —of the bank's successor, Belagroprombank (Belarusian Agricultural and Industrial Bank). During 1993- 2010 he was with  the National Bank of Belarus, where he was vice-chairman (1993-2009) and first vice-chairman (2009-2010). During 2010-2014 he was  head of the Bank , Belarusian branch of Russian Vnesheconombank.

On 27 December 2014 he was appointed head of the National Bank of the Republic of Belarus.

References 

Belarusian economists
Belarusian bankers
1962 births
Living people
Belarus State Economic University alumni
Financial services in Belarus